Neureut may refer to:

Neureut (Karlsruhe), a borough of Karlsruhe, Baden-Württemberg
Neureuth (mountain), a mountain in Bavaria